Nebulous is a British comedy-sci-fi broadcast on BBC Radio 4, starring Mark Gatiss as the title character, and also starring and written by Graham Duff. Set in 2099 AD, the series covers the work Professor Nebulous, head of K.E.N.T. (The Key Environmental Non-Judgmental Taskforce), an organisation designed to solve the problems the Earth's ruined environment.

Currently, three series of six episodes each have been broadcast. The first series was broadcast between 6 January and 10 February 2005. The second was broadcast between 5 April and 10 May 2006. The third and most recent series was broadcast between 15 May and 19 June 2008. All of the episodes have been written by Duff, have been produced by Ted Dowd and directed by Nicholas Briggs. So far, only the first series has been released on CD, but it has been announced that the BBC plans to release the second and third series at an unknown date.

First series

Second series

Third series

"Missing" Episodes
In the sleeve notes of the Series One audiobook, written in 2006, series writer Graham Duff asks for assistance in finding episodes "currently missing from the BBC archive". The article is a parody of when television and radio stations such as the BBC used to "wipe" episodes of TV and radio programmes, and record over them, especially the loss of many early Doctor Who and Dad's Army episodes. In the notes, Duff claims that as a result of wiping, "many classic Nebulous episodes were destroyed, along with editions of iconic Radio 4 shows such as Gardeners' Question Time and Money Box Live."

According to Duff, even after the discovery of two episodes from Season 6 "The Man Who Kissed His Own Brain" and "Tomorrow is a Tunnel" which were apparently found in the basement of a LDS Church near Chorley in September 2005, there are still a further 23 episodes officially missing from the BBC archive, including the entirety of Season 10.

Duff describes the "Missing" Season 10 episodes as follows:

Duff also claims that in October 2005, a 49-second segment of the otherwise "missing" Season 8 episode "The Flesh Eating Cushions" was discovered in a locked BBC cupboard.

Notes
Duff, Graham, "Can You Help?" and "Those Missing Episodes". Nebulous: Series 1 Sleeve Notes. Published by BBC Audiobooks and Baby Cow Productions. Written in 2006 and published on 2007-02-05.
Wolf, Ian: Nebulous Episode Guide. British Comedy Guide. Retrieved on 2009-01-30.
Episode Synopsis. Nebulous City. Retrieved on 2009-01-30.

References

External links
Nebulous on the BBC Radio 4 website.

Nebulous
Post-apocalyptic fiction